Urgency may refer to:

 Pan-pan, international radio calls for emergencies posing no imminent danger
 Urinary urgency or Bowel urgency, medical symptoms
 Urgency (Low Level Flight album), 2007
 Urgency (The Pale Pacific album), 2005
 The Urgency, an album by Saving Grace

See also 
 Emergency (disambiguation)